Hatton Promotions is a promotional company headed by former two-weight world champion Ricky Hatton with Richard Poxon as Director of Boxing.

Starting up
On 4 February 2009, Hatton Promotions was officially launched at a press conference in which Ricky Hatton's fight with Manny Pacquiao was also announced.

The company is based in Hyde, Manchester and comprises a state of the art fitness suite, a large boxing gym with two full-size rings and offices.

In July 2009 having staged only four boxing events Hatton Promotions signed a deal with Sky to broadcast eight shows. Hatton said at the time: "Sky have been fantastic to us in handing us eight dates so early and we want to pay them back for their support by improving in everything we do".

Notable boxers
Hatton promotions have had a large roster of boxers on their books, many of which are champions. These include;
Martin Murray - the reigning British, Commonwealth and WBA Intercontinental champion.
Joe Murray - a 2008 Olympian and rising prospect.
Lucas Browne - Australian Heavyweight contender and former WBA regular champion
Zhanat Zhakiyanov - Kazkahstani WBA Super World Bantamweight Champion
Sergey Rabchenko - Belarusian junior-middleweight prospect
Matty Askin - a 2008 ABA Cruiserweight Champion and current Central Area Cruiserweight belt holder.
Adam Etches - a boxer in the light-middleweight division
Denton Vassell - the current Commonwealth welterweight champion
Craig Watson - the former British welterweight champion, also a Commonwealth titlist at both welterweight and light-middleweight.
Gary Buckland - a former Celtic lightweight champion and Prizefighter winner at super-featherweight. Currently the British champion after beating Gary Sykes.
Craig Lyon - the current English bantamweight champion
Ashley Theophane - the former British light-welterweight champion
Richard Towers - a heavyweight boxer who stands 6f8ins.
Adam Little - An impressive prospect from Blackpool

See also
Hayemaker Promotions

References

External links
 Official website

British boxing promoters
Sport in Tameside
Professional boxing organizations
Sports event promotion companies
Companies based in Tameside